Chen Chao-jung, also known as Aaron Chen, is a Taiwanese actor and businessman.

He is known for starring in several of Tsai Ming-liang's films, including Rebels of the Neon God and Vive L'Amour. He is also considered a household name in Taiwan in the early 2000s as a television actor, starring in numerous long-running Taiwanese Hokkien series.

Selected filmography
 Comedy Makes You Cry (2010)
 20th Century Boys 3: Redemption (2009)
 Face (2009)
 Goodbye, Dragon Inn (2003)
 What Time Is It There? (2001)
 Cop Abula (1999)
 The Personals (1998)
 The River (1997)
 Vive L'Amour (1994)
 Eat Drink Man Woman (1994)
 Rebels of the Neon God (1993)
 Year of the Dragon (1985)
 Blood of Dragon Peril (1980)

References

External links

 
 

Living people
Taiwanese male film actors
Taiwanese male television actors
Place of birth missing (living people)
1968 births